The 2005 Hassanal Bolkiah Trophy is the second edition of the invitational tournament hosted by Brunei. The tournament take place in Brunei from 12–25 March 2005. Nine teams from the ASEAN Football Federation participate in the tournament for under the age of 22.

Thailand emerged as the champion after beating Myanmar by 3–0 in the final, while both Vietnam and Laos shared the third place.

Venues

Squads

Group stage 
 All times are Brunei Darussalam Time (BNT) – UTC+8.

Tie-breaking criteria 
The teams are ranked according to points (3 points for a win, 1 point for a tie, 0 points for a loss) and tie breakers are in following order:
 Greater number of points obtained in the group matches between the teams concerned;
 Goal difference resulting from the group matches between the teams concerned;
 Greater number of goals scored in the group matches between the teams concerned;
 Result of direct matches;
 Drawing of lots.

Group A

Group B

Knockout stage

Semi-finals

Final

Team statistics 
As per statistical convention in football, matches decided in extra time are counted as wins and losses, while matches decided by penalty shoot-outs are counted as draws.

References

External links 
 2005 Results

2005 in Asian football
2002
2005 in Brunei football
2005 in Burmese football
2005 in Malaysian football
2005 in Philippine football
2005 in Laotian football
2005 in Vietnamese football
2004–05 in Indonesian football
2005 in Singaporean football
2005 in Thai football